The 1976 National League was contested as the second division of Speedway in the United Kingdom having been renamed from the previous season's moniker of New National League.

Summary
The league was reduced from 20 teams down to 18, following the loss of three teams and gain of one. Birmingham Brummies moved up to the British League and Bradford Barons and Crewe Kings both closed down. Sadly for Crewe the team would never return. The additional team was the Oxford Cheetahs, who had returned to their traditional name following a three year period known as the Oxford Rebels. The Rebels team and promoters had moved to White City during the winter but Oxford were saved by new promoters Harry Bastable and Tony Allsop after a committee of fans had created a "Save Our Stadium" campaign over the previous winter.

Newcastle Diamonds comfortably won their first National League title, completing a cup double, and dropping only seven points. The Owen brothers Joe Owen and Tom Owen topped the averages for the second consecutive year. Joe finished with an 11+ average and won the British League Division Two Riders Championship and Newcastle completed the league and cup double.

Final table

National League Knockout Cup
The 1976 Speedway Star Knockout Cup was the ninth edition of the Knockout Cup for tier two teams. Newcastle Diamonds were the winners of the competition.

First round

Second round

Quarter-finals

Semi-finals

Final
First leg

Second leg

Newcastle were declared Knockout Cup Champions, winning on aggregate 83–72.

Leading final averages

Riders & final averages
Berwick

Graham Jones 8.12 
Dave Gifford 7.91
Mike Hiftle 7.17
Robin Adlington 6.84
Willie Templeton 6.63
Eddie Argall 6.54
Keith Williams 2.00
Peter Waite 1.80
Wayne Brown 1.71

Boston

Rob Hollingworth 9.63 
Billy Burton 8.26
Paul Gilbert 6.58
Stuart Cope 5.82
Trevor Whiting 5.57
Chris Emery 5.56
Steve Clarke 5.28
Ron Cooper 5.00
Dave Allen 3.46

Canterbury

Graham Banks 8.06
Steve Koppe 7.85
Les Rumsey 7.50
Barney Kennett 6.84
Graham Clifton 6.55
Reg Luckhurst 6.51
Bob Spelta 5.47
Terry Casserley 5.13

Coatbridge

Brian Collins 9.09
Grahame Dawson 7.91
Mick McKeon 6.79 
Jimmy Gallacher 5.68
Derek Richardson 5.65
Max Brown 5.18
Doug Templeton 5.18
Rob Maxfield 5.02
Benny Rourke 4.83
John Wilson 2.93

Crayford

Laurie Etheridge 9.87
Alan Sage 8.78
Mike Broadbank 7.33
Pete Wigley 7.22
Alan Johns 6.54
Trevor Barnwell 5.71
Bill Archer 5.45
Richard Davey 4.71
Gary Spencer 4.10
John Hooper 3.09
Dave Shepherd 2.77

Eastbourne

Steve Weatherley 10.35
Eric Dugard 7.03
Pete Jarman 6.75
Colin Richardson 6.50
Mike Sampson 6.49
Ian Gledhill 6.43
Steve Naylor 5.45
Roger Abel 5.27
Ian Fletcher 4.32

Ellesmere Port

John Jackson 10.08
Chris Turner 9.35
Steve Finch 8.07
Robbie Gardner 7.45
Duncan Meredith 6.09
Gerald Smitherman 5.80
Phil Collins 4.33
Geoff Jones 3.71
Louis Carr 2.78

Mildenhall

Bob Coles 9.21
Kevin Jolly 8.41
Trevor Jones 7.88
Alan Cowland 6.24
Fred Mills 5.67
John Gibbons 5.54
Stan Stevens 5.13
Robert Henry 4.93
Mick Bates 4.81
Neil Leeks 3.54

Newcastle

Joe Owen 11.54 
Tom Owen 10.43 
Ron Henderson 8.33 
Phil Micheledies 7.54 
Brian Havelock 7.51
Andy Cusworth 7.40
Robbie Blackadder 6.20
Tim Swales 5.91

Oxford

Carl Askew 8.03
Brian Leonard 7.33
Phil Bass 7.14
Mick Handley 7.02
Malcolm Corradine 6.10
Roy Sizmore 5.91
Jim Wells 5.88
Kevin Young 5.47
Steve Holden 3.69

Paisley

Colin Farquharson 8.22 
Mick Fishwick 6.99
Stuart Mountford 6.79 
Mike Fullerton 5.37 
Alan Bridgett 5.17
Sid Sheldrick 5.10
Malcolm Chambers 3.96
Chris Roynon 3.91
Mick Sheldrick 3.83
Colin Caffrey 3.16
Tom Davie 2.34

Peterborough

Brian Clark 9.37 
Tony Featherstone 8.11 
Ian Clark 6.93
Roy Carter 6.85
Ken Matthews 6.53
Steve Taylor 6.42
Kevin Hawkins 5.33
Nigel Couzens 5.11
Alan Cowland 4.24
Paul Cooper 4.19
Russ Osborne 4.15

Rye House

Ted Hubbard 9.17 
Kelvin Mullarkey 7.55 
Hugh Saunders 7.47 
Brian Foote 7.03
Karl Fiala 6.73
Bobby Garrad 6.13
Bob Cooper 5.11
Ashley Pullen 4.91

Scunthorpe

Keith Evans 9.27
Andy Hines 6.77
Tony Boyle 5.97
Phil Kynman 5.72
Colin Cook 5.34
Sid Sheldrick 5.10
Ray Watkins 4.98
Tony Gillias 4.75

Stoke

Les Collins 9.31 
Jack Millen 7.90
Malcolm Corradine 7.35
Ricky Day 6.07
Jim Brett 5.74
Mick Newton 5.69
Steve McDermott 5.33
Tim Nunan 5.01
Colin Meredith 4.82

Teesside
 
Alan Emerson 8.41
Tom Leadbitter 7.67 
Steve Wilcock 5.85
Pete Reading 5.54
Andy Cowan 5.27
Pete Smith 4.92
Nigel Close 4.78
John Robson 2.95
Martyn Cusworth 2.50

Weymouth

Martin Yeates 8.69
Vic Harding 7.18
Chris Robins 7.07
Gerald Purkiss 6.25
Danny Kennedy .5.82
Billy Spiers 5.32
Garry May 3.51
Trevor Vincent/Charley 3.94
Jack Walker 3.54
Roger Stratton 3.47

Workington

Lou Sansom 8.77
Steve Lawson 8.72
Taffy Owen 8.07 
Colin Goad 7.67 
Brian Havelock 7.67
Roger Wright 6.54
Terry Kelly 5.57
Chris Bevan 3.80
Stewart Collin 3.16

See also
List of United Kingdom Speedway League Champions
Knockout Cup (speedway)

References

Speedway British League Division Two / National League